Convent of Sinners (Italian: La monaca nel peccato/ The Sinful Nun), is a 1986 Italian nunsploitation erotic film directed by Joe D'Amato (as Dario Donati). D'Amato directed, photographed and edited the film. The Rene Rivet screenplay was based on the novel "La Religeuse" by Denis Diderot.

Plot
France, 1700. Young Susanna is raped by her stepfather. Her mother witnesses the crime and urges that Susanna be put into a convent, against her will. The monastery is a strange place since many nuns are oversexed. Some of them sometimes masturbate and flog themselves. The Mother Superior is sexually attracted to Susanna and makes advances. This arouses the jealousy of her former lover Sister Theresa, who starts scheming to regain her former position.

As the Mother Superior's tuberculosis grows stronger, Theresa takes temporary command of the monastery and abuses her power to make Susanna's life a living hell. Theresa spreads a rumor that Susanna is possessed by the Devil, and locks her in a rat-infested dungeon, then tricks the poor girl into drinking a substance that makes her feverish. She later orders some of the nuns to drag Susanna naked from her bed and whips her violently, claiming she is just trying to beat the Devil out of her.

The Monsignor hears word that one of the local nuns is demonically possessed and decides to investigate. He sends his personal exorcist to the convent, and Susanna is tied up and tortured and confined to a cell. At Theresa's behest, an exorcist even subjects Susanna to a douche by means of a vaginal syringe filled with holy water to clean the Devil from her body. When the Mother Superior dies, Susanna is accused of causing her death by witchcraft. Finally a trial is held in which Susanna is accused of being in league with Satan.

Cast

 Eva Grimaldi as Susanna Simonin
 Karin Well as Sister Teresa
 Gabriele Gori as Handyman
 Jessica Moore as Sister Ursula
 Martin Philips as Don Morel
 Gabriele Tinti as Monsignore
 Maria Pia Parisi 
 Katalin Murany 		
 Beba Balteano 	
 Aldina Martano

See also
 List of Italian films of 1986

Notes

External links
 

Films directed by Joe D'Amato
1980s erotic drama films
1986 films
Italian erotic drama films
Films set in the 18th century
Incest in film
Nunsploitation films
Films scored by Stefano Mainetti
1986 drama films
Films based on French novels
Denis Diderot
1980s Italian films